James Douglas Hepburn (born 21 May 1979) is a Scottish politician who has served as Minister for Higher Education and Further Education, Youth Employment and Training since 2021. A member of the Scottish National Party (SNP), he has been Member of the Scottish Parliament (MSP) for Cumbernauld and Kilsyth since 2011, having previously represented the Central Scotland region from 2007 to 2011.

Hepburn has served in numerous roles within the Scottish Government, first as Minister for Sport, Health Improvement and Mental Health from 2014 to 2016, then as Minister for Employability and Training from 2016 to 2018, and Minister for Business, Fair Work and Skills from 2018 to 2021.

Early life 
Born in Glasgow, Hepburn was educated at Hyndland Secondary School and graduated from the University of Glasgow with a Politics and History degree. Whilst a student, Hepburn ran the unsuccessful campaign for Alasdair Gray to become the Rector of the University of Glasgow and was the Senior Vice-President at the Glasgow University Students' Representative Council, a post once held by his SNP Parliamentary colleague Alasdair Allan.

Career 

Before his election, Hepburn was convener of the Federation of Student Nationalists and the Young Scots for Independence. He had been the SNP candidate for the Cumbernauld, Kilsyth and Kirkintilloch East constituency at the 2005 general election.  He has worked for Alex Neil, a fellow SNP MSP.

Hepburn was elected during the 2007 election for the Central Scotland region, having also contested the Cumbernauld and Kilsyth seat at that election, finishing second behind Cathie Craigie.  In this election he was one of only two candidates to win more than 40% in the constituency contested and not win the seat, the other being Alasdair Morrison in the Western Isles. He was the second youngest elected member of the Scottish Parliament for the 2007–2011 session after his SNP colleague Aileen Campbell.

Hepburn was a member of the Scottish Parliament Rural Affairs and Environment Committee and a substitute member of the Equal Opportunities Committee until 26 June 2008 when he became a member of the European and External Relations Committee, and a substitute to the Rural Affairs and Environment Committee, before being switched to a substitute member of the Public Petitions Committee.  He subsequently was moved to the Public Audit and Equal Opportunities Committees towards the latter part of the third session of the Scottish Parliament.  He is now the Deputy Convener of the Infrastructure and Capital Investment Committee.  Hepburn also served as the convener of the Cross Party Group on Human Rights and Civil Liberties in the Scottish Parliament's third session.

He was placed third on the SNP list for Central Scotland for the 2011 Scottish Parliament election but was returned for the Cumbernauld and Kilsyth constituency. On 21 November 2014, it was announced that he would be Minister for Sport and Health Improvement. On 18 May he was moved to the post of Minister for Employability and Training.

It was Hepburn's written question which revealed that projects in Scotland funded by the Private Finance Initiative will cost the taxpayer some £22.3 billion over a 40-year period.

He was one of six SNP MSPs to attend the "Big Blockade" event at the Faslane naval base organised by Faslane 365 on 1 October 2007 and has been active in calling for greater transparency about allegations that American government agencies facilitated extraordinary rendition flights through Scottish airports.  He has also called for any Scottish airport that is being sold by BAA Limited to be brought under public control.

Hepburn has signed up to the People's Charter, a campaigning document prepared by trade unionists as an alternative to neoliberalism and has drawn criticism from some elements of the Scottish media for having tabled a motion on Venezuela.

Personal life 
Hepburn's wife Julie was the SNP candidate for Cumbernauld, Kilsyth and Kirkintilloch East at the 2010 UK general election, she finished in second place to Labour with 9,794 votes. He is a supporter of Partick Thistle Football Club and lives in Cumbernauld.

References

External links
 
 Parliamentary website
 2011 Campaign website 
 Cumbernauldnl.info interview Jamie Hepburn MSP

1979 births
Living people
Politicians from Glasgow
People educated at Hyndland Secondary School
Alumni of the University of Glasgow
Scottish National Party MSPs
Members of the Scottish Parliament 2007–2011
Members of the Scottish Parliament 2011–2016
Members of the Scottish Parliament 2016–2021
Members of the Scottish Parliament 2021–2026
Ministers of the Scottish Government
Scottish National Party parliamentary candidates
People associated with North Lanarkshire